The Waldorf Statement was a two-page press release issued on 24 November 1947, by Eric Johnston, president of the Motion Picture Association of America, following a closed-door meeting by forty-eight motion picture company executives at New York City's Waldorf-Astoria Hotel. The Statement was a response to the contempt of Congress charges against the so-called "Hollywood Ten".

Participants
The names of the 48 men who attended the meeting at the Waldorf-Astoria Hotel were printed in the Motion Picture Herald and Daily Variety, the film industry's primary trade publications. The principal participants who formulated the Waldorf Statement included:
Louis B. Mayer:  Metro-Goldwyn-Mayer
Harry Cohn:  Columbia Pictures
Spyros Skouras:  20th Century Fox
Nicholas Schenck:  Loews Theatres 
Barney Balaban:  Paramount Pictures
Samuel Goldwyn:  Samuel Goldwyn Company
Albert Warner:  Warner Bros.
William Goetz:  Universal-International 
Eric Johnston:  Association of Motion Picture Producers and Motion Picture Association of America
Mendel Silberberg:  lawyer for Association of Motion Picture Producers 
James F. Byrnes:  former United States Secretary of State
Dore Schary:  RKO Pictures

Text

References 

Political statements
Hollywood blacklist
Motion Picture Association
1947 in the United States
1947 documents